Lygaeus truculentus is a species of seed bug in the family Lygaeidae, found in California.

References

External links

 

Lygaeidae
Insects described in 1862